Gerrit Haring House is a historic house at 224 Old Tappan Road in Old Tappan, Bergen County, New Jersey, United States.

This mid-eighteenth-century house was added to the National Register of Historic Places in 1983.

See also 
 National Register of Historic Places listings in Bergen County, New Jersey

References

External links

Houses on the National Register of Historic Places in New Jersey
Houses in Bergen County, New Jersey
National Register of Historic Places in Bergen County, New Jersey
Old Tappan, New Jersey
New Jersey Register of Historic Places